Joaquin Torres may refer to:

 Joaquín Torres (footballer) (born 1997), Argentinian footballer
 Joaquín Torres-García (1874–1949), Spanish-Uruguayan artist
 Joaquin Torres (comics), a Marvel Comics character
 Joaquin Torres (Marvel Cinematic Universe), a version of the character